Thirty Seconds to Mars is an American rock band from Los Angeles, California. Formed in 1998, the band currently consists of Jared Leto on lead vocals and rhythm guitar, Shannon Leto on drums, and Tomo Miličević on lead guitar and keyboards. The band released the debut album 30 Seconds to Mars (2002) to limited success; it was their second album, A Beautiful Lie (2005), that pushed the band into the public eye. The album's success was boosted by the single "The Kill" and its subsequent music video, which received two nominations at the 2006 MTV Video Music Awards. The album spawned two Kerrang! Award-winning singles, "The Kill" and "From Yesterday". A Beautiful Lie was followed by This Is War (2009), which produced two Alternative Songs number one singles, "Kings and Queens" and "This Is War". The first single from the album, "Kings and Queens", received four nominations at the 2010 MTV Video Music Awards, winning Best Rock Video. "Hurricane" also earned the band's third Kerrang! Award for Best Single.

Thirty Seconds to Mars has received six Kerrang! Awards, three were Best International Band in 2008, 2010 and 2011. The band won nine MTV Europe Music Awards, including three Best Rock in 2007, 2008 and 2010, and four Best Alternative in 2011, 2013, 2014 and 2017. It has also received six nominations from the Billboard Music Awards, winning Modern Rock Artist of the Year. Thirty Seconds to Mars also achieved a place in Guinness World Records for most live shows during a single album cycle, with over 300 shows. This Is War and Love, Lust, Faith and Dreams (2013) were both nominated for the Echo Music Prize.

AltRock Awards
The AltRock Award is presented annually by the American radio station i99Radio. Thirty Seconds to Mars has received four awards from six nominations.

!
|-
!scope="row" rowspan="3"|2014
|rowspan="2"|Thirty Seconds to Mars
|Artist of the Year
|
|style="text-align:center;" rowspan="3"|
|-
|Best Online Performance
|
|-
|"Do or Die"
|Song of the Year
|
|-
!scope="row" rowspan="3"|2018
|rowspan="2"|Thirty Seconds to Mars 
|Tour of the Year
|
|style="text-align:center;" rowspan="3"|
|-
|Best Online Performance
|
|-
|"Walk on Water"
|Song of the Year
|

Bandit Rock Awards
The Bandit Rock Award is presented annually by the Swedish radio station of the same name. Thirty Seconds to Mars has received one award from two nominations.

!
|-
!scope="row" rowspan="2"|2008
|Thirty Seconds to Mars
|Breakthrough Artist – International
|
|style="text-align:center;" rowspan="2"|
|-
|A Beautiful Lie
|Best Album – International
|

Billboard Awards

Billboard Music Awards
The Billboard Music Awards are given to artists based on sales data by Nielsen SoundScan and radio information by Nielsen Broadcast Data Systems. The award ceremony was held from 1990 to 2007, until its reintroduction in 2011, but winners in many categories have been announced by Billboard both in the press and as part of their year-end issue. Thirty Seconds to Mars has received one award from six nominations.

!
|-
!scope="row"|2006
|"The Kill"
|Modern Rock Single of the Year
|
|style="text-align:center;"|
|-
!scope="row" rowspan="2"|2007
|Thirty Seconds to Mars
|Modern Rock Artist of the Year
|
|style="text-align:center;" rowspan="2"|
|-
|"From Yesterday"
|Modern Rock Single of the Year
|
|-
!scope="row" rowspan="3"|2010
|rowspan="2"|Thirty Seconds to Mars
|Top Alternative Artist
|
|style="text-align:center;" rowspan="3"|
|-
|Top Rock Artist
|
|-
|"This Is War"
|Top Alternative Song
|

Billboard Touring Awards
The Billboard Touring Award is an annual meeting sponsored by Billboard which also honors the top international live entertainment industry artists and professionals. Thirty Seconds to Mars has received one nomination.

!
|-
!scope="row"|2014
|Carnivores Tour
|Eventful Award for Tour of the Year
|
|style="text-align:center;"|

Bravo Otto Awards
The Bravo Otto Awards is an annual awards ceremony presented by the German magazine Bravo to honor the year's biggest achievements in music, movies, sports and television. Thirty Seconds to Mars has received one award from two nominations.

!
|-
!scope="row"|2011
|rowspan="2"|Thirty Seconds to Mars
|Rock Group
|
|style="text-align:center;"|
|-
!scope="row"|2013
|International Duo/Group of the Year
|
|style="text-align:center;"|

Breakthrough of the Year Awards
The Breakthrough of the Year Award is an annual awards ceremony presented by Penske Media Corporation. Jared Leto has been awarded once.

!
|-
!scope="row"|2006
|Jared Leto
|Crossover Artist
|
|style="text-align:center;"|

BT Digital Music Awards
The BT Digital Music Award was a British music award ceremony held annually until 2011. Thirty Seconds to Mars has received one nomination.

!
|-
!scope="row"|2010
|Thirty Seconds to Mars
|Artist of the Year
|
|style="text-align:center;"|

Camerimage
The Camerimage is an annual festival held in Poland dedicated to the celebration of cinematography. Thirty Seconds to Mars has received two nominations.

!
|-
!scope="row" rowspan="2"|2013
|rowspan="2"|"Up in the Air"
|Best Music Video
|
|style="text-align:center;" rowspan="2"|
|-
|Best Cinematography in a Music Video
|

Clarín Awards 
The Clarín Award is an annual awards ceremony presented by the Argentine newspaper Clarín. Thirty Seconds to Mars has received three awards.

!
|-
!scope="row" rowspan="3"|2007
|Thirty Seconds to Mars
|Best International Band
|
|style="text-align:center;" rowspan="3"|
|-
|rowspan="2"|"From Yesterday"
|Best Song
|
|-
|Best Video
|

CMA Awards
The CMA Award was an annual awards ceremony to honor the year's biggest achievements in music, movies, sports and television in Germany. Thirty Seconds to Mars has received two awards from four nominations.

!
|-
!scope="row" rowspan="4"|2010
|Thirty Seconds to Mars
|Best International Band
|
|style="text-align:center;" rowspan="4"|
|-
|This Is War
|Best International Album
|
|-
|"Kings and Queens"
|Best International Single
|
|-
|"Closer to the Edge"
|Best International Music Video
|

Drummies Awards
The Drummies Awards is presented annually by the American magazine Drum!. Shannon Leto has received one award from three nominations.

!
|-
!scope="row"|2009
|rowspan="3"|Shannon Leto
|Alternative Drummer
|
|style="text-align:center;"|
|-
!scope="row"|2011
|Alternative Drummer
|
|style="text-align:center;"|
|-
!scope="row"|2012
|Indie Drummer
|
|style="text-align:center;"|

Echo Music Prize
The Echo Music Prize is awarded annually by the Deutsche Phono-Akademie (an association of recording companies in Germany) for outstanding achievements in the music industry. Thirty Seconds to Mars has received two nominations.

!
|-
!scope="row"|2011
|This Is War
|Best International Rock/Alternative
|
|style="text-align:center;"|
|-
!scope="row"|2014
|Love, Lust, Faith and Dreams
|Best International Rock/Alternative
|
|style="text-align:center;"|

Fangoria Chainsaw Awards
The Fangoria Chainsaw Award is presented annually by the American magazine Fangoria. Thirty Seconds to Mars has received two awards.

!
|-
!scope="row" rowspan="2"|2007
|"The Kill"
|Best Video Inspired by Film
|
|style="text-align:center;" rowspan="2"|
|-
|Jared Leto
|Prince of Darkness
|

Fuse Awards
The Fuse Award is presented periodically by the American music channel Fuse. Thirty Seconds to Mars has received one award from two nominations.

!
|-
!scope="row"|2007
|Thirty Seconds to Mars
|Artist of the Year
|
|style="text-align:center;"|
|-
!scope="row"|2010
|"Kings and Queens"
|Best Video
|
|style="text-align:center;"|

Gotham Awards
The Gotham Awards is an annual awards ceremony presented to the makers of independent films. Thirty Seconds to Mars has been awarded once.

!
|-
!scope="row"|2012
|Artifact
|Audience Award
|
|style="text-align:center;"|

Guinness World Records
The Guinness World Records is a reference book published annually, containing a collection of world records, both human achievements and the extremes of the natural world. Thirty Seconds to Mars currently holds one world record.

!
|-
!scope="row"|2011
|Into the Wild Tour
|Most Shows Performed During an Album Cycle
|
|style="text-align:center;"|

iHeartRadio Music Awards
The iHeartRadio Music Awards is an annual awards ceremony presented by iHeartRadio. Thirty Seconds to Mars has received two nominations.

!
|-
!scope="row" rowspan="2"|2018
|"Walk on Water"
|Alternative Rock Song of the Year 
|
|style="text-align:center;" rowspan="2"|
|-
|"The Tribute Song"
|Best Cover Song
|
|-
!scope="row"|2019
|Thirty Seconds to Mars
|Alternative Rock Artist of the Year 
|
|style="text-align:center;"|

Kerrang! Awards
The Kerrang! Award is presented annually by the British magazine Kerrang!. Thirty Seconds to Mars has received six awards from eighteen nominations.

!
|-
!scope="row" rowspan="2"|2007
|Thirty Seconds to Mars
|Best International Newcomer 
|
|style="text-align:center;" rowspan="2"|
|-
|"The Kill"
|Best Single
|
|-
!scope="row" rowspan="4"|2008
|rowspan="2"|Thirty Seconds to Mars
|Best International Band
|
|style="text-align:center;" rowspan="4"|
|-
|Best Live Band
|
|-
|"From Yesterday"
|Best Single
|
|-
|"A Beautiful Lie"
|Best Video
|
|-
!scope="row" rowspan="4"|2010
|rowspan="2"|Thirty Seconds to Mars
|Best International Band
|
|style="text-align:center;" rowspan="4"|
|-
|Best Live Band
|
|-
|This Is War
|Best Album
|
|-
|"Kings and Queens"
|Best Video
|
|-
!scope="row" rowspan="4"|2011
|rowspan="2"|Thirty Seconds to Mars
|Best International Band
|
|style="text-align:center;" rowspan="4"|
|-
|Best Live Band
|
|-
|rowspan="2"|"Hurricane"
|Best Single
|
|-
|Best Video
|
|-
!scope="row" rowspan="2"|2012
|Thirty Seconds to Mars
|Best International Band
|
|style="text-align:center;" rowspan="2"|
|-
|Jared Leto
|Hero of the Year
|
|-
!scope="row"|2013
|"Up in the Air"
|Best Video
|
|style="text-align:center;"|
|-
!scope="row"|2014
|"City of Angels"
|Best Video
|
|style="text-align:center;"|

Live Lounge of the Year
The Live Lounge of the Year was a competition presented by BBC Radio 1 to honor the best live performances on Live Lounge. Thirty Seconds to Mars has received two nominations.

!
|-
!scope="row" rowspan="2"|2011
|"Bad Romance"
|rowspan="2"|Live Lounge of the Year
|
|style="text-align:center;" rowspan="2"|
|-
|"This Is War"
|

Loudwire Music Awards
The Loudwire Music Award is presented annually by the American online magazine Loudwire. Thirty Seconds to Mars has been awarded once.

!
|-
!scope="row"|2014
|"City of Angels"
|Best Video
|
|style="text-align:center;"|

MK Awards
The MK Awards was an annual awards ceremony presented by the South African music channel MK. Thirty Seconds to Mars has received one nomination.

!
|-
!scope="row"|2011
|"Kings and Queens"
|Best International Song
|
|style="text-align:center;"|

MTV Awards

Los Premios MTV Latinoamérica
The Los Premios MTV Latinoamérica was the Latin American version of the MTV Video Music Awards. Thirty Seconds to Mars has received one award from three nominations.

!
|-
!scope="row"|2007
|rowspan="3"|Thirty Seconds to Mars
|Best Rock Artist — International
|
|style="text-align:center;"|
|-
!scope="row" rowspan="2"|2008
|Best Rock Artist — International
|
|style="text-align:center;" rowspan="2"|
|-
|Best Fan Club
|

MTV Asia Awards
The MTV Asia Awards was an annual awards ceremony presented by MTV Asia. Thirty Seconds to Mars has been awarded once.

!
|-
!scope="row"|2008
|"A Beautiful Lie"
|Best Video
|
|style="text-align:center;"|

MTV Australia Awards
The MTV Australia Awards was an annual awards ceremony presented by MTV Australia. Thirty Seconds to Mars has received two awards from three nominations.

!
|-
!scope="row" rowspan="3"|2007
|rowspan="3"|"The Kill"
|Video of the Year
|
|style="text-align:center;" rowspan="3"|
|-
|Best Rock Video
|
|-
|Viewer's Choice
|

MTV Europe Music Awards
The MTV Europe Music Awards is an annual awards ceremony presented by Viacom International Media Networks to honor artists and music in pop culture. Thirty Seconds to Mars has received nine awards from sixteen nominations.

!
|-
!scope="row" rowspan="2"|2007
|rowspan="3"|Thirty Seconds to Mars
|Best Rock
|
|style="text-align:center;" rowspan="2"|
|-
|Best Inter Act
|
|-
!scope="row" rowspan="2"|2008
|Best Rock
|
|style="text-align:center;" rowspan="2"|
|-
|"A Beautiful Lie"
|Best Video
|
|-
!scope="row" rowspan="3"|2010
|rowspan="2"|Thirty Seconds to Mars
|Best Rock
|
|style="text-align:center;" rowspan="3"|
|-
|Best World Stage Performance
|
|-
|"Kings and Queens"
|Best Video
|
|-
!scope="row" rowspan="3"|2011
|rowspan="5"|Thirty Seconds to Mars
|Best Alternative
|
|style="text-align:center;" rowspan="3"|
|-
|Best World Stage Performance
|
|-
|Biggest Fans
|
|-
!scope="row" rowspan="3"|2013
|Best Alternative
|
|style="text-align:center;" rowspan="3"|
|-
|Biggest Fans
|
|-
|"Up in the Air"
|Best Video
|
|-
!scope="row"|2014
|rowspan="3"|Thirty Seconds to Mars
|Best Alternative
|
|style="text-align:center;"|
|-
!scope="row"|2017
|Best Alternative
|
|style="text-align:center;"|
|-
!scope="row"|2018
|Best Alternative
|
|style="text-align:center;"|
|-

MTV Fan Music Awards
The MTV Fan Music Awards was an annual awards ceremony presented by MTV Networks. Thirty Seconds to Mars has received two awards from four nominations.

!
|-
!scope="row" rowspan="4"|2011
|rowspan="2"|Thirty Seconds to Mars
|Best Group
|
|style="text-align:center;" rowspan="4"|
|-
|Best Rock
|
|-
|"Hurricane"
|Best Group Video
|
|-
|Jared Leto
|Best Fashion
|

MTV Italian Music Awards
The MTV Italian Music Awards is an annual awards ceremony presented by MTV Italy. Thirty Seconds to Mars has received four awards from ten nominations.

!
|-
!scope="row"|2007
|rowspan="4"|Thirty Seconds to Mars
|Best New Artist
|
|style="text-align:center;"|
|-
!scope="row" rowspan="3"|2008
|Best Band
|
|style="text-align:center;" rowspan="3"|
|-
|Best Live
|
|-
|Best Cartello
|
|-
!scope="row"|2009
|"A Beautiful Lie"
|Playlist Generation
|
|style="text-align:center;"|
|-
!scope="row"|2010
|rowspan="2"|Thirty Seconds to Mars
|Best International Act
|
|style="text-align:center;"|
|-
!scope="row" rowspan="2"|2011
|Best Band
|
|style="text-align:center;" rowspan="2"|
|-
|Jared Leto
|Best Look
|
|-
!scope="row"|2014
|Thirty Seconds to Mars
|Best Artist
|
|style="text-align:center;"|
|-
!scope="row"|2015
|Jared Leto
|Best Band Blog or Twitter
|
|style="text-align:center;"|

MTV Video Music Awards
The MTV Video Music Awards is an annual awards ceremony presented by MTV to celebrate the top music videos of the year. Thirty Seconds to Mars has received three awards from thirteen nominations.

!
|-
!scope="row" rowspan="2"|2006
|rowspan="2"|"The Kill"
|Best Rock Video
|
|style="text-align:center;" rowspan="2"|
|-
|MTV2 Award
|
|-
!scope="row" rowspan="4"|2010
|rowspan="4"|"Kings and Queens"
|Video of the Year
|
|style="text-align:center;" rowspan="4"|
|-
|Best Rock Video
|
|-
|Best Direction
|
|-
|Best Art Direction
|
|-
!scope="row" rowspan="3"|2011
|rowspan="3"|"Hurricane"
|Best Direction
|
|style="text-align:center;" rowspan="3"|
|-
|Best Editing
|
|-
|Best Cinematography
|
|-
!scope="row" rowspan="3"|2013
|rowspan="3"|"Up in the Air"
|Best Rock Video
|
|style="text-align:center;" rowspan="3"|
|-
|Best Art Direction
|
|-
|Best Cinematography
|
|-
!scope="row"|2014
|"City of Angels"
|Best Cinematography
|
|style="text-align:center;"|
|-
!scope="row"|2018
|"Walk on Water"
|Best Rock
|
|style="text-align:center;"|

MTV Video Music Awards Japan
The MTV Video Music Awards Japan is the Japanese version of the MTV Video Music Awards. Thirty Seconds to Mars has received one nomination.

!
|-
!scope="row"|2014
|"Up in the Air"
|Best Group Video
|
|style="text-align:center;"|

MTV Video Plays Awards
The MTV Video Plays Award is presented annually by MTV to celebrate the most played music videos across its international networks. Thirty Seconds to Mars has received three awards.

!
|-
!scope="row"|2008
|"A Beautiful Lie"
|MTV Gold Video Plays Award 
|
|style="text-align:center;"|
|-
!scope="row" rowspan="2"|2010
|"Closer to the Edge"
|MTV Gold Video Plays Award
|
|style="text-align:center;" rowspan="2"|
|-
|"Kings and Queens"
|MTV Gold Video Plays Award
|

mtvU Woodie Awards
The mtvU Woodie Awards is an annual awards ceremony presented by mtvU. Thirty Seconds to Mars has been awarded once.

!
|-
!scope="row"|2006
|"The Kill"
|Best Video Woodie – Live Action
|
|style="text-align:center;"|

NME Awards
The NME Award is presented annually by the British magazine NME. Thirty Seconds to Mars has received one award from five nominations.

!
|-
!scope="row"|2011
|Jared Leto
|Hottest Male
|
|style="text-align:center;"|
|-
!scope="row" rowspan="3"|2012
|Thirty Seconds to Mars
|Best Fan Community 
|
|style="text-align:center;" rowspan="3"|
|-
|Notes from the Outernet
|Best Book
|
|-
|Jared Leto
|Hottest Male
|
|-
!scope="row"|2013
|Thirty Seconds to Mars
|Best Fan Community
|
|style="text-align:center;"|

O Music Awards
The O Music Award is presented annually by Viacom to honor the art, creativity, personality and technology of music into the digital space. Thirty Seconds to Mars has received two awards from five nominations.

!
|-
!scope="row" rowspan="2"|2011
|"Hurricane"
|NSFW Music Video
|
|style="text-align:center;" rowspan="2"|
|-
|Echelon
|Fan Army FTW
|
|-
!scope="row" rowspan="2"|2012
|Thirty Seconds to Mars
|Best Online Concert Experience
|
|style="text-align:center;" rowspan="2"|
|-
|rowspan="2"|Echelon
|Fan Army FTW
|
|-
!scope="row"|2013
|Fan Army FTW
|
|style="text-align:center;"|

Onstage Awards
The Onstage Awards is a set of awards for live music production. Thirty Seconds to Mars has received two nominations.

!
|-
!scope="row"|2015
|rowspan="2"|Thirty Seconds to Mars
|Best Fan Community
|
|style="text-align:center;"|
|-
!scope="row"|2019
|Best International Band
|
|style="text-align:center;"|

Planeta Awards
The Planeta Award is presented annually by the Peruvian radio station of the same name. Thirty Seconds to Mars has received two awards from five nominations.

!
|-
!scope="row" rowspan="5"|2007
|rowspan="2"|Thirty Seconds to Mars
|Group of the Year
|
|style="text-align:center;" rowspan="5"|
|-
|Rock Artist of the Year
|
|-
|rowspan="3"|"The Kill"
|Song of the Year
|
|-
|Rock Song of the Year
|
|-
|Best Male Vocal Interpretation
|

Rock on Request Awards
The Rock on Request Award was presented annually by the American online magazine Rock on Request. Thirty Seconds to Mars has received nineteen awards.

!
|-
!scope="row" rowspan="7"|2007
|Thirty Seconds to Mars
|Artist of the Year
|
|style="text-align:center;" rowspan="7"|
|-
|A Beautiful Lie
|Best Album
|
|-
|rowspan="3"|"From Yesterday"
|Best Male Rock Vocal Performance
|
|-
|Best Song
|
|-
|Best Video
|
|-
|Jared Leto
|Frontman of the Year
|
|-
|Echelon/Mars Army
|Best Fan Community
|
|-
!scope="row" rowspan="6"|2008
|rowspan="2"|Thirty Seconds to Mars
|Best Alternative
|
|style="text-align:center;" rowspan="6"|
|-
|Best Modern Rock
|
|-
|rowspan="2"|"A Beautiful Lie"
|Best Song
|
|-
|Best Video
|
|-
|A Beautiful Lie European Tour
|Best Festival/Tour
|
|-
|Jared Leto
|Frontman of the Year
|
|-
!scope="row" rowspan="6"|2009
|rowspan="2"|Thirty Seconds to Mars
|Best Alternative
|
|style="text-align:center;" rowspan="6"|
|-
|In a Class by Themselves
|
|-
|This Is War
|Best Album
|
|-
|rowspan="2"|"Kings and Queens"
|Best Song
|
|-
|Best Video
|
|-
|Jared Leto
|Frontman of the Year
|

Rockol Awards
The Rockol Award is presented annually by the Italian online magazine Rockol. Thirty Seconds to Mars has received two awards.

!
|-
!scope="row" rowspan="2"|2018
|Thirty Seconds to Mars
|Best Live – International
|
|style="text-align:center;"|
|-
|America
|Best Album – International
|
|style="text-align:center;"|

Teen Choice Awards
The Teen Choice Award is an annual awards ceremony to honor the year's biggest achievements in music, movies, sports and television, being voted by young people aged between 13 and 19. Thirty Seconds to Mars has received one nomination.

!
|-
!scope="row"|2011
|Thirty Seconds to Mars
|Rock Group
|
|style="text-align:center;"|

TMF Awards
The TMF Awards was an annual awards ceremony presented by The Music Factory. Thirty Seconds to Mars has received four nominations.

!
|-
!scope="row" rowspan="2"|2007
|rowspan="3"|Thirty Seconds to Mars
|Best New Artist – International
|
|style="text-align:center;" rowspan="2"|
|-
|Best Alternative – International
|
|-
!scope="row" rowspan="2"|2008
|Best Rock – International
|
|style="text-align:center;" rowspan="2"|
|-
|"A Beautiful Lie"
|Best Video – International
|

TMJ Awards
The TMJ Award was presented annually by the American radio TMJ. Thirty Seconds to Mars has received one award from six nominations.

!
|-
!scope="row" rowspan="6"|2010
|rowspan="3"|Thirty Seconds to Mars
|Artist of the Year 
|
|style="text-align:center;" rowspan="6"|
|-
|Best Live Show
|
|-
|Favorite Band/Group
|
|-
|This Is War
|Album of the Year
|
|-
|rowspan="2"|"Kings and Queens"
|Song of the Year
|
|-
|Best Rock Song
|

Toronto International Film Festival
The Toronto International Film Festival is an eleven-day film festival held in Toronto, Ontario. Thirty Seconds to Mars has been awarded once.

!
|-
!scope="row"|2012
|Artifact
|People's Choice Award for Best Documentary 
|
|style="text-align:center;"|

TPi Awards
The TPi Awards is presented annually by the British magazine TPi to honor the top international live entertainment industry artists and professionals. Thirty Seconds to Mars has received one nomination.

!
|-
!scope="row"|2015
|Love, Lust, Faith and Dreams Tour
|Live Production of The Year
|
|style="text-align:center;"|

Shorty Awards
The Shorty Award is an annual awards event recognizing the people and organizations producing real-time short form content across social web. Thirty Seconds to Mars has received one nomination.

!
|-
!scope="row"|2012
|Thirty Seconds to Mars
|Best Band
|
|style="text-align:center;"|

Virgin Media Music Awards
The Virgin Media Music Awards is an annual awards ceremony presented by Virgin Media. Thirty Seconds to Mars has received two nominations.

!
|-
!scope="row" rowspan="2"|2007
|"The Kill"
|Best Video
|
|style="text-align:center;" rowspan="2"|
|-
|Jared Leto
|Most Fanciable Male
|

World Music Awards
The World Music Awards is an international awards show to honor recording artists based on worldwide sales figures provided by the International Federation of the Phonographic Industry (IFPI). Thirty Seconds to Mars has received one nomination.

!
|-
!scope="row"|2014
|Love, Lust, Faith and Dreams
|World's Best Album 
|
|style="text-align:center;"|

Miscellaneous awards and honors

References

Thirty Seconds to Mars
Awards

bar:30 Seconds to Mars#Auszeichnungen